Sydney or Sidney Hall may refer to:
 Sydney Prior Hall (1842–1922), British portrait painter and illustrator
 Sydney Hall (actor), African-American actor
 Sidney Hall (1788–1831), British engraver
 The Vanishing of Sidney Hall, a 2017 American drama film

See also
Syd Hall (disambiguation)